For a Wife's Honor is a 1908 American silent short drama film directed by D. W. Griffith.

Cast
 Charles Inslee as Irving Robertson
 Harry Solter as Frank Wilson
 Linda Arvidson as The Maid
 George Gebhardt as Henderson, the Manager
 Charles Gorman
 Arthur V. Johnson

References

External links
 

1908 films
1908 drama films
1908 short films
Silent American drama films
American silent short films
American black-and-white films
Films directed by D. W. Griffith
1900s American films